Devlin is a compilation album by American guitarist Tony Rice, originally released in 1987. It contains tracks included on Rice's previous albums Mar West and Still Inside. Both albums were credited to The Tony Rice Unit. The reissue does not include the songs "Mar East", "Mister Diffenbach" and "Tzigani".

Track listing 
All songs by Tony Rice unless otherwise noted. 
 "Devlin" – 5:20  
 "Is That So" – 4:26  
 "Waltz for Indira" – 3:21  
 "Within Specs" – 3:47  
 "Untitled as of Yet" – 4:24  
 "Neon Tetra" – 4:25  
 "Night Coach" – 4:14  
 "Nardis" (Miles Davis) – 3:47  
 "EBA" (Jon Sholle) – 3:23  
 "Mar West" – 5:31  
 "Moses Sole" – 4:58  
 "Birdland Breakdown" (John Reischman) – 3:29  
 "Whoa Baby, Every Day I Wake up With the Blues" – 3:56  
 "Vonetta" (Earl Klugh) – 3:28  
 "Makers Mark" – 5:23

Personnel
Tony Rice – guitar
John Reischman – mandolin
Fred Carpenter – violin
Todd Phillips – bass
Sam Bush – mandolin
Richard Greene – violin
Mike Marshall – mandolin

References

1987 compilation albums
1990 compilation albums
Tony Rice compilation albums
Rounder Records compilation albums